Florence Nkurukenda (born 1941) is a Ugandan educator and former Member of Parliament. She served as the Woman Representative for the Masindi District on the National Resistance Committee (1989 - 1996) during which time she was appointed Deputy Minister of Labour (1988) and Local Government (1989 - 1991). She was also the Deputy Chairperson of Uganda's Interim Electoral Commission (1996) and occupied the same position when the Commission was made permanent in 1997.

Background and education 
Nkurukenda was born in Kabale, Uganda.  She has a Bachelor of Arts degree in Fine Art, in addition to a Diploma in Education.

Career

Politics 
Nkurukenda contested in the 1989 Ugandan general elections to become Woman Representative for Masindi District in the then National Resistance Council. Between 1989 and 1991, she would serve as the Deputy Minister for Local Government alongside Stephen Chebrot. Prior to that she had worked as the Deputy Minister of Labour (1988).

Post-politics 
Alongside Syda Bbumba and Florence Ssekagya, Nkurukenda was one of the three women on Uganda's interim Electoral Commission that organised the 1996 Ugandan Presidential and Parliamentary Elections. In October 1996 when the Electoral Commission was made permanent,she was appointed to serve as the Deputy Chairperson on Uganda's Electoral Commission. She deputised Aziz Kasujja but along with 5 other commissioners retired on 31 July 2002 "in public interest"

She was later recruited to train Nigerian Electoral officials under the International Foundation for Election Systems

See also 
 Masindi District 
 Electoral Commission Uganda

References 

1941 births
Living people
Members of the Parliament of Uganda
Ugandan educators
People from Kabale District
20th-century Ugandan politicians
Women members of the Parliament of Uganda